Cullen is an unincorporated community in Charlotte County, Virginia, United States. Cullen has a post office with ZIP code 23934, which opened on April 9, 1909.

References

Unincorporated communities in Charlotte County, Virginia
Unincorporated communities in Virginia